Point Pedro Hospital is a government hospital in Point Pedro, Sri Lanka. It is controlled by the provincial government in Jaffna. As of 2010 it had 264 beds. The hospital is sometimes called Point Pedro Base Hospital.

As well as general medical and surgical care the hospital provides a wide variety of healthcare services including diabetic, dentistry, dermatology, family planning, gynaecology, obstetrics (ante-natal), oncology, ophthalmology, paediatrics, psychiatry and tuberculosis. The hospital also has an emergency department, a physiotherapy unit, an x-ray unit and a blood bank service.

In 2010 the hospital had 16,979 in-patient admissions, 141,939 out-patient visits and 67,111 clinic visits.

References

External links
 Base Hospital Point Pedro, Jaffna Regional Directorate of Health Services

Hospital
Hospitals in Jaffna District
Provincial government hospitals in Sri Lanka